Haut-Sassandra Region is one of the 31 regions of Ivory Coast and is one of two regions in Sassandra-Marahoué District. The region's seat is Daloa. The region's area is 15,190 km², and its population in the 2021 census was 1,739,697, making it the most populous region of Ivory Coast.

Departments and geography
Haut-Sassandra is currently divided into four departments: Daloa, Issia, Vavoua, and Zoukougbeu.

The region is traversed by a northwesterly line of equal latitude and longitude.

History

Haut-Sassandra Region was created in 1997 as a first-level administrative region of the country. In 2000, Gagnoa Department was split off from Haut-Sassandra and combined with Oumé Department from Marahoué Region to form Fromager Region.

As part of the 2011 administrative reorganisation of the subdivisions of Ivory Coast, Haut-Sassandra was converted into a second-level administrative region and became part of the new first-level Sassandra-Marahoué District. No territorial changes were made to Haut-Sassandra as a result of the reorganisation.

Notes

 
Regions of Sassandra-Marahoué District
1997 establishments in Ivory Coast
States and territories established in 1997